This is a list of awards and nominations received by Little Children. The film received three Academy Award nominations, including Best Actress for Kate Winslet, Best Supporting Actor for Jackie Earle Haley, and Best Adapted Screenplay for Todd Field and Tom Perrotta.

Organizations

Guilds

Film festivals

Critics groups

References

External links
 

Lists of accolades by film